Robt Ptak (born October 13, 1970) is an American rock singer-songwriter, guitarist, bassist, and record producer who is the co-founding member and bassist/backing vocalist for 1990s pop punk band Size 14.

Career

Size 14

The band Size 14 was formed when Ptak placed an ad in a Los Angeles classified magazine. Ptak and bandmate Linus of Hollywood recorded all of the band's early demos on Ptak's 8 Track.  Ptak can also be heard singing backing vocals and the high falsettos parts on the band's songs. Ptak left the band in 1997 and was replaced by Ray Santangelo.

Other projects
In 1996 Ptak toured with Jakob Dylan for 3 months as a bass player and backup vocalist, playing songs from the album titled "Bringing Down the Horse". On the same tour he joined Tobi and Tammi Jaffee, more importantly he recorded a great track named "Pain in my Head", with Andrew Slater Dylan's manager, which was engineered by Toni Miller of The Wallflowers. Ptak was involved with The Wallflowers between the years 1996–1997 when Size 14 was signed.

Later on Ptak moved to New York City to start a live version of his solo-project Artificial Joy which consisted of singer Milena Mepris (who later went to form Pin Me Down), bassist Mark Cevellos, and drummer Alex Elena. Later, drummer John Lamkin also joined. The band produced one 7 track CD. After Artificial Joy disbanded, Ptak played bass and guitar on Laura Dawn's album titled "Believer" in 2001, along with Laura Dawn, Carl Glanville, Ted Niceley, Harry Nilsson, Simeon Spiegel and Yoshiki. Ptak also formed the rock band The Bastard Kings of Rock with Ptak on Lead vocals and lead guitar, Aristotle Dreher on bass and Michael Hamilton on drums, the band split up in 2004, after which Ptak focused on management and production.

Work as manager

Ptak was the manager of Pin Me Down the side project from Bloc Party guitarist Russell Lissack and Artificial Joy singer Milena Mepris. Ptak and Renee Frisch also executive produced the band's album, while Alex Elena was the album's producer.

Current
Robt Ptak has released demos/studio recordings via a SoundCloud page through the name DPG MEDIA.  Ptak has also released some of this music via his Facebook Musician Page.

Bands

Discography

Size 14
 "Size 14" (1997)

Laura Dawn album
 "Believer" (2001)

References

External links
 

1970 births
Living people
American male composers
21st-century American composers
American male songwriters
American record producers
American male bass guitarists
21st-century American singers
21st-century American bass guitarists
21st-century American male singers